Altamirano is a town in the Mexican state of Chiapas. It serves as the municipal seat for the surrounding municipality of Altamirano. As of 2010, the town of Altamirano had a population of 9,200, up from 6,155 as of 2005.

Altamirano was one of the towns occupied by the Zapatista Army of National Liberation (EZLN) in its January 1994 uprising.

References

Altamirano (Enciclopedia de los Municipios de México) 
Altamirano, Chiapas, at GEOnet Names Server

Populated places in Chiapas